GCH may refer to:
 Gachsaran Airport, in Iran
 Garelochhead railway station, in Scotland
 Generalized continuum hypothesis, in mathematical set theory
 Gold Coast University Hospital, in Australia
 Grand Cross of the Order of Princely Heritage
 Grey Coat Hospital, a secondary school in London
 GTP cyclohydrolase I, an enzyme
 Gym Class Heroes, an American band
 Knight Grand Cross of the Royal Guelphic Order